Chakia is a town and a subdivision in East Champaran district in the Indian state of Bihar. Chakia is a sub division of East Champaran district. It is located approximately 48 Kilometres northwest of Muzaffarpur. 32 kilometers southeast of its District headquarters Motihari.

Transportation
This town is served by a broad gauge train and connected by NH-28 Mehsi city,   Muzaffarpur–Gorakhpur main line under the Samastipur railway division.

Demographics
 India census, Chakia had a population of 20,686. Males constitute 53% of the population and females 47%. Chakia has an average literacy rate of 51%, lower than the national average of 59.5%; with male literacy of 60% and female literacy of 40%. 20% of the population is under 6 years of age.

References

External links
https://web.archive.org/web/20200319114547/https://www.barachakia.com/ Chakia Town Website
https://web.archive.org/web/20070929153637/http://eastchamparan.bih.nic.in./chakia.html District Administration Website

Cities and towns in East Champaran district
Bihar